Udrzyn  is a village in the administrative district of Gmina Brańszczyk, within Wyszków County, Masovian Voivodeship, in east-central Poland.

The village has a population of 400.

References

Udrzyn